Fearless is the debut studio album by the Mexican heavy metal band S7N, released on November 25, 2013. Fearless produced two singles, considered the most well-known songs from the band, "Blackout" and "Double Dealing". In 2014, the album was nominated for Best Metal Album in Mexico's Independent Music Awards.

Production and promotion
The band recorded the album in TRM Lab in Mexico City during April and May, 2013. The album was produced by Allison's singer Erik Canales, who also participated with arrangements.

Singles
The band's debut single "Blackout" was released on June 24, 2014, with a music video directed by Cheeno Mesdrage. "Blackout" gave the band national media attention, leading S7N to perform as opening acts for Havok, Ghost, and Napalm Death. Later that year, the band released an acoustic version, dubbed "Blackoustic", as a single via Bandcamp. In 2015, "Blackout" featured in Netflix's Club de Cuervos first season's episode 7, Nuestro Guggenheim.

The second single "Double Dealing" was released on May 12, 2015, again with a music video by Mesdrage. Reina El Metal ranked it second on its list of "The 10 Most Outstanding Mexican Metal Videoclips of 2015".

Reception

Fearless received positive reviews from music critics. Bruce Moore from Pure Grain Audio praised the album's "killer yet tasteful riffage, intense shredding guitar solos, chugging rhythms and an overall rawness." Amy Ocha of Rolling Stone Mexico compared the album with Metallica's Ride The Lightning.

Track listing

Personnel
S7N
 Mao Kanto – lead vocals, rhythm guitar
 Guillermo García – lead guitar, backing vocals
 Israel Monroy – lead guitar, backing vocals
 Lalo Olvera – bass guitar
 Fabián Carreño – drums

Production
 Erik Canales – producer, arrangements
 Juan Martín Macías – engineer
 Daniel Amaya – mixing
 Karla Farrugia – cover art

References

External links

S7N at Spotify (streamed copy where licensed)

S7N albums
2013 debut albums